Nansō Satomi Hakkenden is a Japanese epic novel (yomihon) written and published over twenty-eight years (1814–42) in the Edo period, by Kyokutei Bakin. Set in the Muromachi period, the story follows eight fictional warriors, connected spiritually but born into different families throughout the Kantō region, coming together and fighting as vassals of the Satomi clan; as well as numerous side plots. Bakin researched about the Satomi clan by referring to war tales about the Satomi clan and the Hōjō clan such as Satomiki (里見記), Satomi Kyudaiki (里見九代記) and Hojo Godaiki (:ja:北条五代記), and completed the story line of Nansō Satomi Hakkenden by referring to them.

The novel, consisting of 98 chapters printed in a total of 106 booklets, is considered the largest novel in the history of Japanese Literature. Bakin, in his 70s by the time the work was completed, had gone blind before finishing the tale, and dictated the final parts to his daughter-in-law Michi Tokimura. Along with Ueda Akinari's Ugetsu Monogatari, it is considered a masterpiece of gesaku literature, and one of the classics of Japanese historical fiction. The title has been translated as The Eight Dog Chronicles, Tale of Eight Dogs, or Biographies of Eight Dogs.

Plot 

Nansō Satomi Hakkenden is a novel about the tale of eight youngsters (The Eight Dog Warriors) bound by a fateful connection in another world between Princess Fuse, a princess of the Satomi clan in Awa, and the dog of kami Yatsufusa, set in the late Muromachi period (350 years before Bakin lived). The eight Dog Warriors, who commonly have family names including the character for '犬' (Inu, dog) each have a peony-shaped bruise somewhere on their body and a bead of Japamala with the characters for humanity, justice, courtesy, wisdom, loyalty, sincerity, filial piety and obedience. Born in various parts of the eight provinces of Kanto region, they get to know each other guided by their fate while experiencing hardships, and gather together under the Satomi clan. They served the Satomi clan and fought against the allied forces of powerful feudal lords, and the story came to an end. The themes of their adventures are loyalty, clan honor, Bushido, Confucianism, and Buddhist philosophy.

Inception 
Bakin was heavily inspired by Chinese vernacular fiction, especially Water Margin, which had been translated and published in Japan at the beginning of the 18th century. Bakin most frequently referred to Nansō Satomi Hakkenden's genre as Haishi (commonly translated as petty history, or people's history), a Chinese genre of vernacular historical fiction. Bakin often stated that the primary purpose of the novel was to encourage virtue and chastise vice, which was central to the novel's plots and character archetypes; likening himself to the authors of Haishi in that he used entertaining stories to entice less-educated readers, who would, in turn, be taught morals through allegory. As a work of gesaku, however, the novel also contains tacit social commentary, and often plays with traditional concepts relating to gender and morality.

History of reception
Although only a limited number of copies of the books themselves were printed, the tale was retold through various mediums, including oration and live performance, leading to its popularity among many social classes at the time. Kabuki plays based on Hakkenden were often performed, and ukiyo-e depicting kabuki actors playing the roles of eight warriors were also popular.

Hakkenden, and Bakin's work at large, maintained much of its popularity amongst common people throughout the 19th century, but drew some academic criticism in the Meiji era for its didacticism and one-dimensional characters, as novelists and scholars sought to modernize Japan's literary style. Notably, in literary reformer Tsubouchi Shōyō's influential book Essence of the Novel, published 1885–1886, Bakin is lauded for both his style and his role in popularizing novels, but imitation of Bakin's work is cited as a widespread problem among novelists of the time.

A complete reprinting in ten volumes is available in the original Japanese, as well as various modern Japanese translations, most of them abridged. Only a few chapters have been translated into English, Chapter 25 by Donald Keene, Chapters 12, 13, and 19 by Chris Drake, and in 2021 the first volume of a translation by Glynne Walley, titled Eight Dogs, or "Hakkenden" Part One – An Ill-Considered Jest was published by Cornell University Press.

Adaptations and influenced works 

In live-action film and TV there have been numerous adaptions: the first in 1913, then a series in the 1950s, and since the influential TV series Shin Hakkenden (:ja:新八犬伝) from the early 1970s, every decade has had either a live-action adaptation or a show significantly influenced by the novel, right up through the 2010s.

The novel has also been adapted into kabuki theatre several times. In August 2006, the Kabuki-za put on the play. In 1959, the TOEI motion picture company made Satomi hakken-den. In 1983, the novel was loosely adapted into the film Legend of the Eight Samurai.

Hakkenden has had a strong influence on modern manga and anime works, particularly those based on adventure quests. For example, it influenced Akira Toriyama's Dragon Ball (1984) and Rumiko Takahashi's Inuyasha (1996), which both have plots about the collection of magical crystals or crystal balls.

References

Citations

Works cited 
 Kyokutei Bakin (1819) "Shino and Hamaji". In Keene, Donald (Ed.) ([1955] 1960) Anthology of Japanese Literature: from the earliest era to the mid-nineteenth century, pp. 423–428. New York, NY: Grove Press.  
Kyokutei Bakin (1819) "Fusehime at Toyama Cave," "Fusehime's Decision," "Shino in Otsuka Village," "Hamaji and Shino". Translated by Chris Drake in Haruo Shirane (Ed.) (2002) Early Modern Japanese Literature: An Anthology 1600–1900, pp. 885–909. New York: Columbia University Press.

Further reading

External links

Original text of Nansō Satomi Hakkenden, first 30 chapters as of 2006 (Japanese)
The Hakkenden Hakuryu-Tei website and the complete Japanese version
The Legend of the Eight Samurai Hounds, English translation in progress since September 2015

19th-century Japanese novels
Edo-period works
Japanese novels adapted into plays
Japanese serial novels
Japanese novels adapted into films